Alfi Conteh Lacalle (born 18 January 1985), simply known as Alfi in Spain, is a Spanish-born Sierra Leonean professional footballer who plays as a centre forward for Louisiana Krewe FC in USL League Two. He has been a member of the Sierra Leone national team.

Early life
Conteh was born in Barcelona to a Sierra Leonean father and a Spanish mother.

Club career
Conteh has played for Nyíregyháza Spartacus FC and Budapest Honvéd FC in Hungary.

International career
Conteh made his senior debut for Sierra Leone on 7 June 2008 as a 75th-minute substitution in a 1–0 home loss to Nigeria during the 2010 FIFA World Cup qualification.

References

External links
 Alfi Conteh-Lacalle at USL League Two official website

1985 births
Living people
People with acquired Sierra Leonean citizenship
Sierra Leonean footballers
Spanish footballers
Association football forwards
Sierra Leone international footballers
Spain youth international footballers
Sierra Leonean people of Spanish descent
Kavala F.C. players
Nyíregyháza Spartacus FC players
Budapest Honvéd FC players
F.C. Kallon players
FC Lusitanos players
UE Sant Julià players
Selfoss men's football players
Proodeftiki F.C. players
Football League (Greece) players
Nemzeti Bajnokság I players
Primera Divisió players
Norwegian Third Division players
1. deild karla players
Gamma Ethniki players
Footballers from Barcelona
FC Barcelona players
FC Barcelona C players
FC Barcelona Atlètic players
CF Gavà players
Terrassa FC footballers
CD Dénia footballers
Cartagena FC players
UA Horta players
Tercera División players
Segunda División B players
Divisiones Regionales de Fútbol players
Spanish people of Sierra Leonean descent
Spanish sportspeople of African descent
Sierra Leonean expatriate footballers
Spanish expatriate footballers
Sierra Leonean expatriate sportspeople in Greece
Spanish expatriate sportspeople in Greece
Expatriate footballers in Greece
Sierra Leonean expatriate sportspeople in Hungary
Spanish expatriate sportspeople in Hungary
Expatriate footballers in Hungary
Sierra Leonean expatriates in Andorra
Spanish expatriate sportspeople in Andorra
Expatriate footballers in Andorra
Sierra Leonean expatriate sportspeople in Norway
Spanish expatriate sportspeople in Norway
Expatriate footballers in Norway
Sierra Leonean expatriate sportspeople in Iceland
Spanish expatriate sportspeople in Iceland
Expatriate footballers in Iceland
Sierra Leonean expatriate sportspeople in the United States
Expatriate soccer players in the United States
Spanish expatriate sportspeople in the United States
USL League Two players